Euphaedra sardetta is a butterfly in the family Nymphalidae. It is found in Cameroon, the Democratic Republic of the Congo (Uele).

Butterflies described in 1981
sardetta